Harry Sharp (born 17 December 2002) is an Australian rules footballer who plays for the Brisbane Lions in the Australian Football League (AFL).

Recruited from the Greater Western Victoria Rebels in the NAB League, Sharp was drafted by the Lions with their second selection, pick 43, in the 2020 AFL draft.

Statistics
Updated to the end of the 2022 season.

|-
| 2021 ||  || 22
| 2 || 0 || 0 || 12 || 3 || 15 || 3 || 4 || 0.0 || 0.0 || 6.0 || 1.5 || 7.5 || 1.5 || 2.0
|-
| 2022 ||  || 22
| 5 || 0 || 0 || 20 || 5 || 25 || 4 || 6 || 0.0 || 0.0 || 4.0 || 1.0 || 5.0 || 0.8 || 1.2
|- class=sortbottom
! colspan=3 | Career
! 7 !! 0 !! 0 !! 32 !! 8 !! 40 !! 7 !! 10 !! 0.0 !! 0.0 !! 4.6 !! 1.1 !! 5.7 !! 1.0 !! 1.4
|}

References

External links

2002 births
Living people
Brisbane Lions players
Australian rules footballers from Victoria (Australia)